Nicolae Marinescu (2 September 1884 – 28 April 1963) was a Romanian medical doctor, an army general in World War II, and a politician, holding various cabinet positions.

Marinescu was promoted to brigadier general in April 1937 and to major general in June 1943. He served as Minister of Health and Social Security
in the Argetoianu cabinet from 28 September to 23 November 1939. He also served as Minister of State Secretary for the Department of Labour, Health and Social Security in the First Sănătescu cabinet from 23 August to 3 November 1944.

He was arrested on 5 May 1950 by the Communist authorities and sentenced to 5 years of prison; he was detained at Sighet Prison and released in 1955.

External links
 

1884 births
1963 deaths
People from Argeș County
Place of death missing
Romanian generals
Romanian military personnel of World War II
Generals of World War II
Romanian Ministers of Health
Romanian Ministers of Labor
Members of the Romanian Academy of Sciences
20th-century Romanian physicians
Inmates of Sighet prison